David Walsh (11 August 1945 – 4 June 1998) was a Canadian businessman in the oil and gas and mining industries.

Biography
Walsh was founder and CEO of the Canadian mining company Bre-X, which was involved in one of the largest stock market scandals in Canadian history. Although Walsh had been oblivious to or dismissive of warning signs before the outbreak of the scandal, he called in RCMP investigators once the fraud was identified, and assisted the RCMP in their criminal investigation.  Before the Bre-X fraud, Walsh had run several successful oil and gas companies with properties throughout the United States and Canada and had been a stock broker, trust company officer, and portfolio manager. He died of an apparent aneurysm in 1998, suffered at his home in the Bahamas.

In popular culture
The Bre-X scandal inspired the 2016 film Gold, in which Matthew McConaughey plays Kenny Wells, who is based on Walsh.

References 

1945 births
1998 deaths
Businesspeople from Montreal
Businesspeople in metals
Canadian chief executives
Canadian expatriates in the Bahamas
Canadian stockbrokers
Canadian mining businesspeople